Once Upon a Time in a Battlefield is a 2003 South Korean war comedy film directed by Lee Joon-ik. Its plot is about the Battle of Hwangsanbeol between Baekje and Silla in the 7th century. The film was the 8th most attended film of 2003 with 2,835,000 tickets sold nationwide. Its popularity has spawned a sequel, titled Battlefield Heroes, which debuted in 2011, and takes place in the subsequent Silla-Tang invasion of Goguryeo.

Plot
The movie starts out with a meeting between the rulers of Baekje, Silla, Tang China, and Goguryeo. They are arguing why the Korean southern kingdoms have to pay tribute to China, even though Tang is only 50 years old. The king of Silla sides with the Emperor of Tang. The movie flashes forward to the scene in which Baekje soldiers rush to the king with ill news of Silla and Tang allying together, bringing an army of 50,000 soldiers. The Baekje council discusses battle plans. But in the end, all of the officials run away out of cowardice. The king of Baekje calls for the great warrior, Kyebaek. He accepts the offer to protect his country after three glasses of wine. Kaebaek is forced to kill his family in fear of something worse happening to them. Soon, Gyebaek engages the Silla forces in so called "battles" where the opponents insult the others with Gyebaek winning in the beginning of these battles.

Cast 
 Park Joong-hoon as Gye-baek
 Jung Jin-young as Kim Yoo-shin
 Lee Moon-sik as Geo Shi-gi
 Oh Ji-myeong
 Lee Won-jong
 Kim Byeong-cheol as Silla spy
Lee Ho-sung as Kim Chun-choo
 Kim Sun-ah
 Ryu Seung-soo as Kin In-moon
 Ahn Nae-sang as Kim Beob-min
 Ko Kyu-pil as Prince of Baekje

References

External links 
 
 

2003 films
2000s war comedy films
South Korean war comedy films
War films based on actual events
War adventure films
Military humor in film
Films set in the 7th century
Films set in Goguryeo
Films set in Baekje
Films set in Silla
Films directed by Lee Joon-ik
2000s Korean-language films
Films set in 7th-century Tang dynasty
2003 comedy films
2000s South Korean films